Vellore Maavattam is a 2011 Indian Tamil-language action film written and directed by R. N. R. Manohar, starring Nandha and Poorna in the lead roles. Produced by AGS Entertainment, the film released on 6 October 2011 on the occasion of the festival of Ayudha Pooja.

Cast

 Nandha as Additional Superintendent of Police Muthukumar IPS
 Poorna as Priya
 Santhanam as Kumaravelu
 Azhagam Perumal as Gurumurthy
 S. Neelakantan as Nachiappan
 G. M. Kumar as Muthukumar's father
 Singamuthu as Veera, Kumaravelu's father
 Swaminathan as Retired S.P.
 Rani as Lakshmi Gurumurthy
 Kaajal Pasupathi as Police Officer
 Sriman
 Manobala
 Sathyan
 Ravi
 V. I. S. Jayapalan
 Mayilsamy
 Vaiyapuri

Soundtrack

The tunes for the album are composed by Sundar C Babu.

Reception 
News18 gave the film a negative review and stated that "For the audience, Vellore Maavattam offers nothing that they haven't seen before!". Behindwoods gave the film a rating of one-and-a-half stars out of five and wrote that "while drawing a line between commercial and realistic cinema, he has missed out major chunks of portions screaming for attention leaving the movie a predictable fare".

References

Indian action films
2011 films
2011 action films
2010s Tamil-language films
Films set in Delhi
Fictional portrayals of the Tamil Nadu Police